SMS Nassau was the first dreadnought battleship built for the Imperial German Navy, a response to the launching of the British battleship . Nassau was laid down on 22 July 1907 at the Kaiserliche Werft in Wilhelmshaven, and launched less than a year later on 7 March 1908, approximately 25 months after Dreadnought.

Nassau saw service in the North Sea at the beginning of World War I, in II Division of I Battle Squadron of the German High Seas Fleet. In August 1915, she entered the Baltic Sea and participated in the Battle of the Gulf of Riga, where she engaged the Russian battleship . Following her return to the North Sea, Nassau and her sister ships took part in the Battle of Jutland on 31 May – 1 June 1916. During the battle, Nassau collided with the British destroyer . Nassau suffered a total of 11 killed and 16 injured during the engagement.

After World War I, the bulk of the High Seas Fleet was interned in Scapa Flow. As they were the oldest German dreadnoughts, the Nassau-class ships were for the time permitted to remain in German ports. After the German fleet was scuttled, Nassau and her three sisters were surrendered to the victorious Allied powers as replacements for the sunken ships. Nassau was ceded to Japan in April 1920. With no use for the ship, Japan sold her to a British wrecking firm which then scrapped her in Dordrecht, Netherlands.

Description 

German designers initially considered ships equipped with  secondary guns, but erroneous reports in early 1904 that the British s would be equipped with a secondary battery of  guns prompted them to consider an even more powerful ship armed with an all-big-gun armament consisting of eight  guns. Over the next two years, the design was refined into a larger vessel with twelve of the guns, by which time Britain had launched the all-big-gun battleship .

She displaced  with a normal load, and  fully laden. The ship had a crew of 40 officers and 968 enlisted men. Nassau retained three-shafted triple expansion engines with twelve coal-fired water-tube boilers instead of more advanced turbine engines. This type of machinery was chosen at the request of both Admiral Alfred von Tirpitz and the Navy's construction department; the latter stated in 1905 that the "use of turbines in heavy warships does not recommend itself." This decision was based solely on cost: at the time, Parsons held a monopoly on steam turbines and required a 1 million gold mark royalty fee for every turbine engine made. German firms were not ready to begin production of turbines on a large scale until 1910.

Nassau carried a main battery of twelve  SK L/45 guns in an unusual hexagonal configuration. Her secondary armament consisted of twelve  SK L/45 guns and sixteen  SK L/45 guns, all of which were mounted in casemates. The ship was also armed with six  submerged torpedo tubes. One tube was mounted in the bow, another in the stern, and two on each broadside, on either ends of the torpedo bulkhead.

Service history 

Nassau was ordered under the provisional name Ersatz Bayern, as a replacement for the old  . She was laid down on 22 July 1907 at the Kaiserliche Werft in Wilhelmshaven, under construction number 30. Construction work proceeded under absolute secrecy; detachments of soldiers were tasked with guarding the shipyard itself, as well as contractors that supplied building materials, such as Krupp. The ship was launched on 7 March 1908; she was christened by Princess Hilda of Nassau, and the ceremony was attended by Kaiser Wilhelm II and Prince Henry of the Netherlands, representing his wife's House of Orange-Nassau.

Fitting-out work was delayed significantly when a dockyard worker accidentally removed a blanking plate from a large pipe, which allowed a significant amount of water to flood the ship. The ship did not have its watertight bulkheads installed, so the water spread throughout the ship and caused it to list to port and sink  to the bottom of the dock. The ship had to be pumped dry and cleaned out, which proved to be a laborious task. The ship was completed by the end of September 1909. She was commissioned into the High Seas Fleet on 1 October 1909, and trials commenced immediately. , the ship that spurred Nassaus construction, had been launched 25 months before Nassau, on 2 February 1906.

On 16 October 1909, Nassau and her sister  participated in a ceremony for the opening of the new third entrance in the Wilhelmshaven Naval Dockyard. They took part in the annual maneuvers of the High Seas Fleet in February 1910 while still on trials. Nassau finished her trials on 3 May and joined the newly created I Battle Squadron of the High Seas Fleet. Over the next four years, the ship participated in the regular series of squadron and fleet maneuvers and training cruises. The one exception was the summer training cruise for 1912 when, due to the Agadir Crisis, the cruise only went into the Baltic. On 14 July 1914, the annual summer cruise to Norway began. The threat of war caused Kaiser Wilhelm II to cancel the cruise after two weeks, and by the end of July the fleet was back in port. War between Austria-Hungary and Serbia broke out on the 28th, and in the span of a week all of the major European powers had joined the conflict.

World War I
Nassau participated in most of the fleet advances into the North Sea throughout the war. The first operation was conducted primarily by Rear Admiral Franz von Hipper's battlecruisers; the ships bombarded the English coastal towns of Scarborough, Hartlepool, and Whitby on 15–16 December 1914. A German battlefleet of 12 dreadnoughts—including Nassau—and eight pre-dreadnoughts sailed in support of the battlecruisers. On the evening of 15 December, they came to within  of an isolated squadron of six British battleships. Skirmishes in the darkness between the rival destroyer screens convinced the German fleet commander, Admiral Friedrich von Ingenohl, that the entire Grand Fleet was deployed before him. Under orders from the Kaiser to not risk the fleet, von Ingenohl broke off the engagement and turned the battlefleet back towards Germany.

Battle of the Gulf of Riga 

In August 1915, the German fleet attempted to clear the Gulf of Riga to facilitate the capture of Riga by the German Army. To do so, the German planners intended to drive off or destroy the Russian naval forces in the area, which included the pre-dreadnought battleship  and a number of gunboats and destroyers. The German naval force would also lay a series of minefields in the northern entrance to the gulf to prevent Russian naval reinforcements from being able to enter the area. The force would operate under the command of Vice Admiral Franz von Hipper. The eight battleships were to provide cover for the forces engaging the Russian flotilla. The first attempt on 8 August was unsuccessful, as it had taken too long to clear the Russian minefields to allow the minelayer  to lay a minefield of her own.

On 16 August 1915, a second attempt was made to enter the gulf: Nassau and Posen, four light cruisers, and 31 torpedo boats managed to breach the Russian defenses. On the first day of the assault, the German minesweeper T 46 was sunk, as was the destroyer V 99. The following day, Nassau and Posen engaged in an artillery duel with Slava, resulting in three hits on the Russian ship that forced her to retreat. By 19 August, the Russian minefields had been cleared, and the flotilla entered the gulf. Reports of Allied submarines in the area prompted the Germans to call off of the operation the following day. Admiral Hipper later remarked that,
"To keep valuable ships for a considerable time in a limited area in which enemy submarines were increasingly active, with the corresponding risk of damage and loss, was to indulge in a gamble out of all proportion to the advantage to be derived from the occupation of the Gulf before the capture of Riga from the land side."

Battle of Jutland 

Nassau took part in the inconclusive Battle of Jutland on 31 May – 1 June 1916, in II Division of I Battle Squadron. For the majority of the battle, I Battle Squadron formed the center of the line of battle, behind Rear Admiral Behncke's III Battle Squadron, and followed by Rear Admiral Mauve's elderly pre-dreadnoughts of II Battle Squadron. Nassau was the third ship in the group of four, behind Rheinland and ahead of Westfalen; Posen was the squadron's flagship. When the German fleet reorganized into a nighttime cruising formation, the order of the ships was inadvertently reversed, and so Nassau was the second ship in the line, astern of Westfalen.

Between 17:48 and 17:52, eleven German dreadnoughts, including Nassau, engaged and opened fire on the British 2nd Light Cruiser Squadron; Nassaus target was the cruiser . The shell struck Southampton obliquely on her port side, and did not cause significant damage. Nassau then shifted her guns to the cruiser ; firing ceased by 18:10. At 19:33, Nassau came into range of the British battleship ; her main guns fired briefly, but after the 180-degree turn by the German fleet, the British ship was no longer within reach.

Nassau followed her sister Westfalen in a 68° turn to starboard in order to evade any torpedoes that might have been fired. The British ships turned away briefly, before turning about to launch torpedoes. Caroline fired two at Nassau; the first passed close to her bows and the second passed under the ship without exploding.

At around midnight on 1 June, the German fleet was attempting to pass behind the British Grand Fleet when it encountered a line of British destroyers. Nassau came upon the destroyer , and in the confusion, attempted to ram her. Spitfire tried to evade, but could not maneuver away fast enough, and the two ships collided. Nassau fired her forward 11-inch guns at the destroyer.  They could not depress low enough for Nassau to be able to score a hit; nonetheless, the blast from the guns destroyed Spitfires bridge. At that point, Spitfire was able to disengage from Nassau, and took with her a 6 m (20 ft) portion of Nassaus side plating. The collision disabled one of Nassaus 15 cm (5.9 in) guns, and left a 3.5 m (11.5 ft) gash above the waterline; this slowed the ship to  until it could be repaired. During the confused action, Nassau was hit by two  shells from the British destroyers, which damaged her searchlights and inflicted minor casualties.

Shortly after 01:00, Nassau and  encountered the British armored cruiser . Thüringen opened fire first, and pummeled Black Prince with a total of 27 heavy-caliber shells and 24 shells from her secondary battery. The heavy fire quickly disabled the British cruiser and set her alight; following a tremendous explosion, she sank, taking her entire crew with her. The sinking Black Prince was directly in the path of Nassau; to avoid the wreck, the ship had to steer sharply towards III Battle Squadron. At around 03:00, several British destroyers attempted another torpedo attack on the German line.

Following her return to German waters, Nassau, her sisters Posen and Westfalen, and the Helgoland-class battleships  and Thüringen, took up defensive positions in the Jade roadstead for the night. In the course of the battle, Nassau was hit twice by secondary shells, though these hits caused no significant damage. Her casualties amounted to 11 men killed and 16 men wounded. During the course of the battle, she fired 106 main battery shells and 75 rounds from her secondary guns. Repairs were completed quickly, and Nassau was back with the fleet by 10 July 1916.

Later operations 

Another fleet advance followed on 18–22 August, during which the I Scouting Group battlecruisers were to bombard the coastal town of Sunderland in an attempt to draw out and destroy Beatty's battlecruisers. The High Seas Fleet, including Nassau, would trail behind and provide cover. The British were aware of the German plans and sortied the Grand Fleet to meet them. By 14:35, Admiral Scheer had been warned of the Grand Fleet's approach and, unwilling to engage the whole of the Grand Fleet just 11 weeks after the close call at Jutland, turned his forces around and retreated to German ports.

Another sortie into the North Sea followed on 19–20 October. On 21 December, Nassau ran aground in the mouth of the Elbe. She was able to free herself, and repairs were effected in Hamburg at the Reihersteig Dockyard until 1 February 1917. The ship was part of the force that steamed to Norway to intercept a heavily escorted British convoy on 23–25 April, though the operation was canceled when the battlecruiser Moltke suffered mechanical damage and had to be towed back to port. Nassau, Ostfriesland, and Thüringen were formed into a special unit for Operation Schlußstein, a planned occupation of Saint Petersburg. On 8 August, Nassau took on 250 soldiers in Wilhelmshaven and then departed for the Baltic. The three ships reached the Baltic on 10 August, but the operation was postponed and eventually canceled. The special unit was dissolved on 21 August, and the battleships were back in Wilhelmshaven on the 23rd.

Nassau and her three sisters were to have taken part in a final fleet action at the end of October 1918, days before the Armistice was to take effect. The bulk of the High Seas Fleet was to have sortied from their base in Wilhelmshaven to engage the British Grand Fleet; Scheer—by now the Grand Admiral (Großadmiral) of the fleet—intended to inflict as much damage as possible on the British navy, to improve Germany's bargaining position, despite the expected casualties. Many of the war-weary sailors felt that the operation would disrupt the peace process and prolong the war. On the morning of 29 October 1918, the order was given to sail from Wilhelmshaven the following day. Starting on the night of 29 October, sailors on Thüringen and then on several other battleships mutinied. The unrest ultimately forced Hipper and Scheer to cancel the operation.

Fate 
Following the German collapse in November 1918, a significant portion of the High Seas Fleet was interned in Scapa Flow. Nassau and her three sisters were not among the ships listed for internment, so they remained at German ports. During this period, from November to December, Hermann Bauer served as the ship's commander. On 21 June 1919, Rear Admiral Ludwig von Reuter, under the mistaken impression that the Armistice would expire at noon that day, ordered his ships be scuttled to prevent their seizure by the British. As a result, the four Nassau-class ships were ceded to the various Allied powers as replacements for the ships that had been sunk. Nassau was awarded to Japan on 7 April 1920, though the Japanese had no need for the ship. They, therefore, sold her in June 1920 to British shipbreakers, who scrapped the ship in Dordrecht.

Notes

Footnotes

Citations

References

Further reading
 

Nassau-class battleships
World War I battleships of Germany
Ships built in Wilhelmshaven
1908 ships